Slender: The Eight Pages (originally titled Slender) is a free-to-play indie-developed first-person survival horror video game released in June 2012 as a beta for Microsoft Windows and OS X by Parsec Productions, using the Unity engine. Developed by Mark J. Hadley, the game is based on the quasi-folklore meme figure known as the Slender Man, who is depicted as a tall humanoid creature wearing a black suit and tie with a white face and no facial features. The character is known for the ominous (although fictitious) abduction of countless children in dark mysterious settings, such as deep forests and abandoned buildings.

Gameplay
Slender: The Eight Pages is set in a dense forest during the middle of the night, and is played from a first person perspective. The player's objective is to collect all eight notes located in various areas of the forest while avoiding the Slender Man. As the player collects pages, the fog in the forest grows thicker, and Slender Man appears closer to the player's character, though the character's sprinting speed slowly increases as well. Slender Man moves by teleporting, creeping around the player, but only from a certain distance. The player is equipped with only a flashlight to see through the dark (its battery life is limited and will eventually shut down permanently if left on for an extended period of time). The player's character has the ability to "jog", which will eventually tire out the player and make them wheeze if forced to go on for too long, causing slower walking as well. Slender Man will occasionally appear in the player's field of vision, accompanied by a loud slamming noise and/or static on the screen. This then allows the ability to "sprint" to become available to the player. "Sprinting" allows the player to move faster than "jogging" does, but will also decrease the maximum stamina available for "jogging" and "sprinting". A game over occurs when either the player has taken too long to find a note, the player stares at Slender Man for too long, or if Slender Man comes into contact with the player, which will turn them around and end the game. The game over screen shows Slender Man's face up close and blinking static pulses.

Even if the player's character successfully collects all the eight pages, the Slender Man will continue to chase them. Once all the pages are collected, one is allowed to walk around for a couple of seconds in total silence until Slender Man finally appears behind the player and ends the game. However, instead of the normal death screen appearing, a slightly different version is played in which the static slowly fades out instead of abruptly stopping. A few moments later the player awakens in the forest, now in the daytime, and can move around for a few seconds before the screen goes black and plays the end credits. New game modes are then unlocked. There is also a grace period in the very beginning of the game, during which Slender Man remains inactive for only a few minutes, or until the player collects the first page. However, the difficulty level increases the longer one goes without collecting any pages. The end of this grace period is indicated by a repetitive stomping sound echoing in the background. This sound is heard throughout the rest of the game and gradually gets quicker as more pages are collected, as well as several other layering sounds. These sounds include a low droning sound (pages 3–4), a loud wind (pages 5–6), and then a mysterious and unnerving beeping sound (page 7). Once all 8 pages are collected, the sounds abruptly fade into silence.

Game modes 
In Version 0.9.4 there is a "Daytime Mode" that can be unlocked. To unlock this mode, the player must beat the game on "Normal", in which the ending shows the player's character awakens in the daytime after collecting all eight pages and being caught by Slender Man. After waking up, the player can walk around in the daytime for a few seconds before the credits roll. "Daytime Mode" is simply during the day and without a flashlight. If the player beats "Daytime Mode" the ending will be the same as before, only the player wakes up at night. After the credits roll, the player will have unlocked "$20 Mode". In this mode, the gameplay is the same as "Normal Mode", except that if the player sees Slender Man a song called "20 Dollars" by American rap artist Ron Browz starts playing. This is a reference to a fan-originated meme about Slender Man, stating that if a person gives Slender Man $20, he will leave the person alone. This is the only version in which the Player selects these modes in the "Options" portion of the menu screen, and this is also the only version in which two hidden modes can be played at the same time ("Daytime Mode" and "$20 Mode"). There is also an "MH (Marble Hornets) Mode", viewing the gameplay as a 'Marble Hornets' entry. The creepy sounds and page collector have been removed, there are static bars on the edges, and the ending is slightly different. The "$20 Mode" has been absent since version 0.9.7; The accompanying readme advises "One game mode removed - it was only a matter of time as it contained copyrighted material", referring to the Browz track that's used in that mode.

Development and release 
The game was first released in version 0.9.0 as Slender. Originally, when the player would be caught by the Slender Man, the game would quit and return to the desktop. It remained this way until version 0.9.3 (the third update), and the player now has the option to either try again or to quit. From version 0.9.7 on, there is an ambiance during the menu screen, as well as portions of the eight pages being shown. There are also now links to the Slender Man Mythos Forums and some popular web series based on the Mythos such as the Marble Hornets and the TribeTwelve. As of this version, the game was officially renamed Slender: The Eight Pages to avoid confusion with its sequel, Slender: The Arrival. "$20 Mode" was also removed from this version due to copyright issues. "MH Mode" was renamed to "Marble Hornets Mode" (simply the unabbreviated version of the title). Two new light sources became available: a glow stick with almost no light, and almost no range at all, and a crank lantern with a wide range, but a short amount of light which must be replenished by cranking the lantern. The player also gained the ability to pause the game by pressing "Escape" on the keyboard, but only when there is no static on the screen as to not allow the player to quit in response to being frightened.

The game was given a backstory in its successor; Slender: The Arrival. It was confirmed that the name of the character controlled in this game is Kate, also known as the Chaser in The Arrival.

Reception
Some publications noted the effectiveness of the game's minimalist horror approach, contrasting it with many action-based survival horror games of the time period, such as the latest Resident Evil titles. The official website crashed after too many people tried to download the game, leading to subsequent mirror downloads on Reddit and later MediaFire.

Legacy

Slender: The Eight Pages gained a cult following through let's players such as PewDiePie and Markiplier, this spawned several clones and fangames.

A reimagining was released one year later, named Slender: The Arrival. In 2022, a remaster was released titled 'Slender Reborn'.

References

External links
 Official Slender: The Eight Pages website

2010s horror video games
2012 video games
Freeware games
Indie video games
MacOS games
Slender Man
Survival horror video games
Video games developed in the United States
Video games featuring female protagonists
Video games set in forests
Windows games
Works based on Internet-based works
Single-player video games